Trimdon is a village in County Durham, in England, previously known as Tremeldon (1196) or Tremedon (1262).

It is 9 miles west of Hartlepool, and adjacent to Trimdon Colliery, Trimdon Grange and Deaf Hill (also known as Trimdon Station). Locally, to distinguish it from these, it is known as Trimdon Village, or simply "The Village".

The main focal point of "The Village" is Saint Mary Magdalene church, which was constructed during the Norman period (approximately 1145AD).

Trimdon Labour Club (now closed) was the setting for some of the former prime minister and constituency MP Tony Blair's constituency speeches. Blair's constituency home was in nearby Trimdon Colliery.

References

External links

 http://www.trimdon.com/
https://trimdonbrass.com/
https://www.facebook.com/TrimdonBrass/?eid=ARCh7PKwMqaeN85nBFKI3FAwATCNncVB6rRK-5olsPbt0k-HYE49LuG_tQT9SujEcgPoj10VD2utTf7B

 
Villages in County Durham
Civil parishes in County Durham